The black-faced sheathbill (Chionis minor), also known as the lesser sheathbill or paddy bird, is one of only two species of sheathbills, aberrant shorebirds which are terrestrial scavengers of subantarctic islands.

Description
They are dumpy, short-necked, pigeon-like birds with white plumage, black bills, caruncles and facial skin. This species measures  in length,  in wingspan and weighs , with males being slightly larger than females.

Distribution
Restricted to subantarctic islands in the southern Indian Ocean: the South African territory of the Prince Edward Islands, the French territories of the Crozet Islands and Kerguelen Islands, and the Australian territory of Heard Island. The race C. m. nasicornis is endemic to Heard Island, while the race C. m. marionesis is endemic to the Prince Edward Islands.

Habitat
Coastlines and intertidal zones of subantarctic islands, especially around seabird and seal colonies, as well as the vicinity of human habitation.

Food
Sheathbills are opportunistic omnivores, predators and scavengers, feeding on strandline debris, algae and other vegetation, as well as on invertebrates, fish, seabird eggs and chicks, seal milk, blood, placentas, carrion, faeces, rodents and human refuse.

Voice
Loud, high-pitched, strident and staccato calls.

Breeding

Nests in crevices, caves and under boulders on untidy piles of vegetation and debris from seabird and seal colonies. Clutch usually 2–3 creamy-white eggs, blotched or speckled brown. Incubation period c.30 days. Young semi-precocial and nidicolous; fledging c.50 days after hatching; breeding at 3–5 years.

Conservation
At risk from scavenging toxic wastes and from introduced predators such as feral cats, but large, scattered range with no evidence of significant overall population decline leads to conservation status assessment of Least Concern.

References

 BirdLife International. (2006). Species factsheet: Chionis minor. Downloaded from https://www.webcitation.org/5QE8rvIqH?url=http://www.birdlife.org/ on 11 February 2007
 Marchant, S.; Higgins, P.J.; & Davies, J.N. (eds). (1994). Handbook of Australian, New Zealand and Antarctic Birds.  Volume 2: Raptors to Lapwings. Oxford University Press: Melbourne.  
 National Photographic Index of Australian Wildlife. (1987). The Shorebirds of Australia. Angus & Robertson: Sydney. 

black-faced sheathbill
Fauna of the Crozet Islands
Fauna of the Prince Edward Islands
Fauna of the Kerguelen Islands
Fauna of Heard Island and McDonald Islands
Birds of the Indian Ocean
Birds of subantarctic islands
black-faced sheathbill
Taxa named by Gustav Hartlaub